Patricia Ann Carroll (May 5, 1927 – July 30, 2022) was an American actress and comedian. She was known for voicing Ursula in The Little Mermaid and for appearances in CBS's The Danny Thomas Show, ABC's Laverne & Shirley, and NBC's ER. Carroll was an Emmy, Drama Desk, and Grammy Award winner, as well as  a Tony Award nominee.

Early life
Carroll was born in Shreveport, Louisiana, on May 5, 1927, to Maurice Clifton Carroll (d. 1963) and Kathryn Angela (née Meagher). Her family moved to Los Angeles when Pat was five years old, and she soon began acting in local productions. She graduated from Immaculate Heart High School and attended Catholic University of America after enlisting in the United States Army as a civilian actress technician.

Career
Carroll began her acting career in 1947. She got her first acting credit as Lorelei Crawford in the 1948 film Hometown Girl. In 1952, she made her television debut in The Red Buttons Show. In 1955, her Broadway debut in Catch a Star! garnered her a nomination for a Tony Award for Best Featured Actress in a Musical. In 1956, Carroll won an Emmy Award for her work on Caesar's Hour and was a regular on the sitcom Make Room for Daddy from 1961 to 1964. She guest-starred in the drama anthology series The DuPont Show with June Allyson. Carroll also appeared on many variety shows of the 1950s, 1960s, and 1970s, such as The Steve Allen show, The Danny Kaye Show, The Red Skelton Show, and The Carol Burnett Show. In 1965 she co-starred as "Prunella", one of the wicked stepsisters in the 1965 production of Rodgers and Hammerstein's musical version of Cinderella.

In the late 1970s Carroll's successful one woman show on Gertrude Stein, Gertrude Stein, Gertrude Stein, Gertrude Stein (by playwright Marty Martin), won several major theater awards; her recorded version won a 1980 Grammy Award for Best Spoken Word, Documentary or Drama.

In early 1976, Carroll was cast as Lily, the mother of Shirley Feeney (played by Cindy Williams) in the episode "Mother Knows Worst" on the hit ABC situation comedy, Laverne & Shirley. She portrayed Pearl Markowitz, the mother of Adam Arkins character Lenny Markowitz, in the 1977 CBS situation comedy Busting Loose. Her frequent television roles in the 1980s included newspaper owner Hope Stinson on the syndicated The Ted Knight Show (the former Too Close for Comfort) during its final season in 1986; and as Gussie Holt, the mother of Suzanne Somers's lead character in the syndicated sitcom She's the Sheriff (1987–1989).

From the late 1980s on, Carroll had a great deal of voice-over work on animated programs such as A Pup Named Scooby-Doo, Galaxy High, and Foofur, and the film A Goofy Movie. On TV's Pound Puppies, she voiced Katrina Stoneheart. On two Garfield television specials (A Garfield Christmas and Garfield's Thanksgiving), she portrayed Jon's feisty Grandmother.  She also voiced the character of Granny in the 2005 re-release of Hayao Miyazaki's My Neighbor Totoro.

In 1989, Carroll portrayed the sea witch Ursula in Disney's The Little Mermaid and sang "Poor Unfortunate Souls". In interviews, Carroll referred to the role, her first as a villain, as one of the favorites of her career. She later reprised the role in other forms of media, including the Kingdom Hearts series of video games, the spinoff television series, the Disney+ series The Wonderful World of Mickey Mouse, and various Disney theme parks attractions and shows, as well as voicing Ursula's sister Morgana in the direct-to-video sequel The Little Mermaid II: Return to the Sea.

Carroll also appeared on a variety of game shows including Celebrity Sweepstakes, You Don't Say, To Tell the Truth, Match Game 73, Password, and I've Got a Secret.

A member of the Actors Studio, she  also enjoyed a successful career in the theater, appearing in numerous plays including productions of Our Town and Sophocles's Electra. In 1990, she starred in The Merry Wives of Windsor at the Shakespeare Theatre at the Folger in the role of Sir John Falstaff, a balding knight with whiskers.

When drama critic Frank Rich of The New York Times reviewed her performance he wrote, "Her performance is a triumph from start to finish, and, I think, a particularly brave and moving one, with implications that go beyond this one production. Ms. Carroll and Mr. Kahn help revivify the argument that the right actresses can perform some of the great classic roles traditionally denied to women and make them their own. It's not a new argument, to be sure; female Hamlets stretch back into history. But what separates Ms. Carroll's Falstaff from some other similar casting experiments of late is that her performance exists to investigate a character rather than merely as ideological window dressing for a gimmicky production."

Personal life
Carroll married Lee Karsian in 1955 and they had three children, including actress Tara Karsian.  The marriage ended in a divorce in 1976. In 1991, Carroll received an honorary doctorate from Siena College in Albany, New York. Carroll, a practicing Roman Catholic, cited that her religious views helped her to determine what projects to accept. She was a lifelong Republican as of 1992.

Hanna-Barbera lawsuit
In 1963, Carroll filed a $12,000 lawsuit against Hanna-Barbera for breach of contract, claiming that she had been cast and signed on to the role of Jane Jetson on The Jetsons. Morey Amsterdam, who alleged that he had been cast as George, was also a plaintiff in the same suit. Although her contracts stipulated she would be paid US$500 an episode with a guarantee of twenty-four episodes (i.e., a full season), she recorded only one episode before being replaced. Several sources claimed the change had occurred as a result of sponsor conflict with Carroll's Make Room for Daddy. The case had been closed by early 1965. Carroll stated in an interview in 2013 that the court had ruled in favor of Hanna-Barbera.

Death
Carroll died of pneumonia at her home in Cape Cod, Massachusetts, on July 30, 2022, at the age of 95.

Filmography

Film

Television

 The Red Buttons Show (1952–1953)
 The Saturday Night Revue (1953)
 Make Room for Daddy (1953)
 The Pepsi-Cola Playhouse (1954)
 Studio 57 (1954) – Sue
 Caesar's Hour (1954) – Alice Brewster
 Producers' Showcase (1955) – Gym teacher
 Kraft Television Theatre (1955)
 The Jimmy Durante Show (1955)
 The Steve Allen Show (1958)
 Hobby Lobby (1959)
 General Electric Theater (1959) – Frances Dowd
 The DuPont Show with June Allyson (1959) – Cherry
 The Ann Sothern Show (1961) – Pandora
 The Investigators (1961) – Blossom Taylor (episode "The Dead End Man")
 The United States Steel Hour (1961)
 The Danny Thomas Show (1961–1964) - Bunny Halper
 The Red Skelton Show (1962)
 Cinderella (1965) – Prunella
 Please Don't Eat the Daisies (1966) – Carol Baker
 The Carol Burnett Show (1971) – Herself; Two appearances in 1971 (Season 4, Episodes 16 and 23) 
 The Mary Tyler Moore Show (1971) – Loretta Kuhne
 The Interns (1971) – Maria
 Love, American Style (1970–1971)
 Getting Together  (1971–1972) – Rita Simon
 Police Story (1974) – Mrs. Gail Bannister
 Nakia (1974) – Belle Jones in episode "A Matter of Choice"
 Laverne & Shirley (1976) – Mrs. Wilhelmina Feeney
 Good Heavens (1976) – Harriet
 Busting Loose (1977) – Pearl Markowitz
 Police Woman (1977) – Miriam Stein
 The Love Boat (1978)
 Legends of the Superheroes (1979) – Esther Hall
 Trapper John, M.D. (1985) – Aunt Mo
 Crazy Like a Fox (1985)
 Yogi's Treasure Hunt (1985) – Additional Voices
 Pound Puppies (1986) – Katrina Stoneheart (voice)
 Galaxy High School (1986) – Ms. Biddy McBrain (voice)
 Foofur (1986–1987) – Hazel (voice)
 Too Close for Comfort (1986) – Mrs. Hope Stinson
 A Garfield Christmas (1987) – Grandma (voice)
 She's the Sheriff (1987–1989) – Gussie Holt
 Superman (1988) – Queen Hippolyta (voice)
 A Pup Named Scooby-Doo (1989) – Paula P. Casso (voice)
 Garfield's Thanksgiving (1989) – Grandma (voice)
 Chip 'n Dale Rescue Rangers (1990) – Koo-Koo (voice)
 Designing Women (1993) – Mrs. Billie Beecham
 The Little Mermaid (1993–1994) – Ursula (voice)
 The Royale (1996) – Mildred Wak
 House of Mouse (2001–2002) – Ursula (voice, 3 episodes)
 ER (2005) – Rebecca Chadwick (3 episodes)
 Tangled: The Series (2017–2018) – Old Lady Crowley (voice, short "Make Me Smile" and episodes "One Angry Princess", "Max's Enemy" and "Secret of the Sun Drop") 
 The Wonderful World of Mickey Mouse (2020) – Ursula (voice, episode "Keep on Rollin")

Video games
 Kingdom Hearts (2002) – Ursula (voice)
 Kingdom Hearts II (2005) – Ursula (voice)
 Kingdom Hearts 3D: Dream Drop Distance (2012) – Ursula (voice)
 Disney Princess: My Fairytale Adventure (2012) – Ursula (voice)
 Disney Dreamlight Valley (2022) – Ursula (voice; final role, released posthumously)

Stage

References

Further reading
   
Lucas, Eddie (2011) "Livingroom Legends: Chats with TV's Famous Faces: Interview With Pat Carroll".

External links

 
 
 
 
 
 

1927 births
2022 deaths
Actresses from Louisiana
American film actresses
American television actresses
American voice actresses
American video game actresses
Drama Desk Award winners
Outstanding Performance by a Supporting Actress in a Comedy Series Primetime Emmy Award winners
Grammy Award winners
Actresses from Los Angeles
20th-century American comedians
21st-century American comedians
Actors from Shreveport, Louisiana
Military personnel from Louisiana
Catholic University of America alumni
Immaculate Heart College alumni
Alumni of Immaculate Heart High School, Los Angeles
20th-century American actresses
21st-century American actresses
20th-century Roman Catholics
21st-century Roman Catholics
Catholics from Louisiana
California Republicans
Louisiana Republicans
Massachusetts Republicans
Deaths from pneumonia in Massachusetts